The hooded cuckooshrike (Coracina longicauda) is a species of bird in the family Campephagidae. It is found in the New Guinea Highlands.

Its natural habitat is subtropical or tropical moist montane forest.

References

hooded cuckooshrike
Birds of New Guinea
hooded cuckooshrike
Taxonomy articles created by Polbot